West Siloam Springs is a town in Delaware County, Oklahoma, United States. The population was 846 at the 2010 census, a 3.5 percent decrease from the figure of 877 recorded in 2000. A bedroom community for Siloam Springs, Arkansas, it is notable for its Cherokee casino, and is the closest town to Natural Falls State Park.

History
In the mid-20th century, the population of Siloam Springs, Arkansas spilled across the Oklahoma - Arkansas state line, creating the need for Oklahoma-based town government. The population of the community had grown to 142  by July 10, 1969, when 35 out of 49 eligible voters approved incorporation.

Geography
West Siloam Springs is located at  (36.178147, -94.595751). It is immediately west of Siloam Springs, Arkansas.

Demographics

As of the census of 2000, there were 877 people, 306 households, and 205 families residing in the town. There were 349 housing units at an average density of 101.1 per square mile (39.1/km2). The racial makeup of the town was 76.40% White, 0.11% African American, 11.74% Native American, 0.57% Asian, 1.14% from other races, and 10.03% from two or more races. Hispanic or Latino of any race were 4.56% of the population.

There were 306 households, out of which 30.1% had children under the age of 18 living with them, 47.4% were married couples living together, 13.4% had a female householder with no husband present, and 33.0% were non-families. 26.8% of all households were made up of individuals, and 8.8% had someone living alone who was 65 years of age or older. The average household size was 2.45 and the average family size was 2.95.

In the town, the population was spread out, with 22.7% under the age of 18, 6.8% from 18 to 24, 27.1% from 25 to 44, 20.9% from 45 to 64, and 22.5% who were 65 years of age or older. The median age was 41 years. For every 100 females, there were 85.4 males. For every 100 females age 18 and over, there were 78.0 males.

The median income for a household in the town was $28,750, and the median income for a family was $31,953. Males had a median income of $22,243 versus $20,000 for females. The per capita income for the town was $12,858. About 13.4% of families and 18.3% of the population were below the poverty line, including 20.0% of those under age 18 and 26.2% of those age 65 or over.

Transportation
The town is located on U.S routes 59 and 412.

Smith Field, a/k/a the Siloam Springs Municipal Airport, is approximately six miles to the east, and features a paved runway of almost 5000’.
Commercial air transportation is available from Northwest Arkansas Regional Airport, about 24 miles to the east-northeast.

Natural Falls State Park 
Nearby is Natural Falls State Park, off Hwy 412 west of town. one of the most beautiful scenic wonders in the state of Oklahoma.  The natural setting and scenic beauty of the waterfall is known to millions of movie lovers. The popular 1974 film Where the Red Fern Grows was filmed in part at Natural Falls (then called Dripping Springs).  The movie tells the story of a young boy growing up in rural Oklahoma during the hard times of the Great Depression and is considered an American classic.

Hildebrand Mill 
To the west of town about 10 miles is Hildebrand Mill, a 1907 water-powered grain mill, later used up to 1967 as a gas-powered lumber mill.  It is on the National Register of Historic Places listings in Delaware County, Oklahoma.

References

Towns in Delaware County, Oklahoma
Towns in Oklahoma
Populated places established in 1969